Shamokin Creek (also known as Great Shamokin Creek or Middle Branch Shamokin Creek) is a tributary of the Susquehanna River in Northumberland County, Pennsylvania, in the United States. It experiences significant impacts by abandoned mine drainage and many abandoned mine drainage discharges are in its watershed. Various other impairments also affect parts of the creek's watershed. Shamokin Creek is in the Appalachian Mountains section of the Ridge and Valley physiographic province. Rock formations consisting of sandstone, shale, and anthracite deposits occur in the watershed.

The main land uses in the watershed of Shamokin Creek are forested land and agricultural land, with barren land and urban land making up only a few percent of the watershed. However, in the upper , forested land and mine spoils dominate, urban land is less prevalent, and agricultural land is virtually nonexistent. Coal mining was being done in the watershed of Shamokin Creek by the early 1800s. In the early 1900s, coal mining, foundries, iron works, nail production, agriculture, silk mills, and woolen mills were the main industries in the watershed. In the 1990s and 2000s, many grants for restoring the creek have been received by various organizations.

The main stem of Shamokin Creek is designated as a Warmwater Fishery and a Migratory Fishery. The creek is devoid of fish life in its upper reaches, but several fish species have been observed further downstream. The upper reaches of the creek also lack macroinvertebrate life. The lower  of the creek are navigable by canoe for part of the year. Pennsylvania State Game Lands Number 165 is also partially in the watershed.

Course

Shamokin Creek begins on the eastern edge of Mount Carmel. It flows northwest for a few tenths of a mile before turning west-southwest, crossing Pennsylvania Route 61, and entering Mount Carmel Township. Here, the creek turns southwest for a few tenths of a mile before turning west-southwest again and receiving the tributary North Branch Shamokin Creek from the right. It then turns southwest for several tenths of a mile and receives the tributary Locust Creek from the left. At this point, the creek turns west-southwest for more than a mile, entering a valley and passing into Coal Township. Soon after entering this township, it turns in a northwesterly direction, flowing alongside Pennsylvania Route 901 and leaving the valley. At this point, the creek receives the tributary Quaker Run from the right and turns west-southwest along the border of the census-designated place of Marshalton. After several tenths of a mile, it turns south-southwest before turning north-northwest and entering Shamokin. Several tenths of a mile after entering Shamokin, the creek receives the tributary Coal Run from the right and turns west-southwest. A few tenths of a mile further downstream, it crosses Pennsylvania Route 125 and receives Carbon Run and Furnace Run from the left and turns north, exiting Shamokin and reentering Coal Township.

Upon entering Coal Township, Shamokin Creek crosses Pennsylvania Route 61 and continues flowing north, passing through a water gap in Big Mountain. The creek continues heading north near Pennsylvania Route 61 and passes along the border of Tharptown/Uniontown, Pennsylvania. Here, it receives Trout Run from the right and turns west for several tenths of a mile, crossing Pennsylvania Route 61. The creek then turns north and passes through a water gap in Little Mountain. In this water gap, the creek exits Coal Township and begins flowing along the border between Ralpho Township and Shamokin Township. It continues flowing north for several miles though a valley and alongside Pennsylvania Route 61, receiving Bennys Run from the left, Millers Run from the right, and Lick Run from the left.

More than a mile after receiving Lick Run, Shamokin Creek turns in a westerly direction for many miles. In this reach, it flows through a much broader and deeper valley. It passes through Shamokin Township and Snydertown before entering Upper Augusta Township. Here, the creek flows in a west-southwesterly direction for several miles before turning south and receiving Little Shamokin Creek, its last named tributary, from the left. Several tenths of a mile further downstream, it flows west for several tenths of a mile, flowing along the border between Sunbury and Upper Augusta Township. The creek then turns southwest for several tenths of a mile and continues flowing along the border until it reaches its confluence with the Susquehanna River.

Shamokin Creek joins the Susquehanna River  upriver of its mouth.

Tributaries

Shamokin Creek has eleven named direct tributaries, including Little Shamokin Creek, Carbon Run, Coal Run, Bennys Run, Locust Creek, and others.

Hydrology
The entire length of Shamokin Creek is designated as impaired due to high levels of metals from abandoned mine drainage. In addition to abandoned mine drainage, the creek is impacted by sewage, disruption of the area's natural hydrology, and probably nutrient pollution, sediment, and low levels of dissolved oxygen. Non-polluted streams in the creek's lower reaches dilute the pollution by more than doubling Shamokin Creek's discharge. However, impairments remain as far downstream as the creek's mouth in Sunbury. There are dozens of abandoned mine drainage discharges in the watershed's upper reaches. Some discharges lead into the watershed of Mahanoy Creek, which has some mine drainage discharges that flow back into the Shamokin Creek watershed.

The pH of Shamokin Creek as far downstream as Sunbury can be as low as 4.2. The pH in the creek's upper reaches is 6.1 to 6.6, depending on the site and the time of year, while in Shamokin, it can range from 6.3 to 6.5; below Shamokin, it can range from 5.9 to 6.3; and at Sunbury, it can range from 4.0 to 6.5.

The creek's streambed is lined with iron in some reaches. The creek has high concentrations of nickel.

In 1917, the Water Resources Inventory Report referred to Shamokin Creek as the worst stream in the Coal Region due to the mine water, culm deposits, and other problems. During this time period, the culm deposits were so extensive that it was one of the few creeks where it was commercially viable to recover coal from its streambed. The creek was black throughout its entire length and typically sluggish in its upper reaches, though it had fast reaches. However, it was clear at its headwaters.

Geography, geology, and climate

The watershed of Shamokin Creek is in the Appalachian Mountains section of the Ridge and Valley physiographic province. The lower reaches of the watershed are in the Northern Shale Valleys and Slopes Ecoregion, while the upper reaches are in the Anthracite Coal Ecoregion. In the early 1900s, vast culm deposits along the creek's banks caused it to lack a defined channel until Snydertown.

The topography of the watershed of Shamokin Creek is "broken and mountainous". The lower reaches of the watershed mainly consist of rolling hills. The creek cuts through Big Mountain and Little Mountain immediately north of Shamokin. Locust Mountain and Mahanoy Mountain are on the southern border of the watershed's upper reaches. Broad alluvial flats occur in the lower reaches of the watershed. Mine spoil and pits occur in the upper reaches. Although mining only occurred in the upper third of the creek's watershed, south of Big Mountain, iron precipitate lines the creek for much of its length.

The channel of Shamokin Creek is sinuous and flows through rock formations consisting of sandstone, shale, and extensive anthracite deposits. There are some culm deposits along the creek. The creek flows between stone walls in Shamokin. The upper  of the watershed, upstream of Big Mountain, are in the Western Middle Anthracite Field, in the Coal Region. There are 34 coal veins in the watershed and nearly all have been either deep-mined or strip-mined. The creek passes through rock of the Hamilton Formation near Paxinos. The creek's valley is partly carved from Marcellus black slate. Red shale of the Mauch Chunk Formation also occurs in the watershed.

Most of these rapids are easily navigable by canoe, but there is one difficult and bouldery rapid near the Glen Burn Colliery. Eventually, the whitewater on the creek becomes less prevalent. By Paxinos, the rapids have almost disappeared, save for some sluices formed by cobbles.

The water temperature of the creek at Shamokin was measured to be  in August 1999.

Watershed

The mouth of the creek is in the United States Geological Survey quadrangle of Sunbury. However, its source is in the quadrangle of Mount Carmel. The creek also passes through the quadrangles of Danville, Shamokin, Riverside, and Trevorton. The creek's watershed mainly occupies southern Columbia County and central Northumberland County. There are 14 municipalities in the watershed of Shamokin Creek, including 13 in Northumberland County and one in Columbia County.

Of these,  (27 percent) are impaired by abandoned mine drainage. In Mount Carmel, the creek is used to carry stormwater. Historically, it carried waste such as untreated sewage from both the community of Mount Carmel and the area's mining industry. Sewage was also discharged into the creek at Sunbury via several pipes.

Forested land and agricultural land dominate the Shamokin Creek watershed as a whole, making up 61 and 32 percent of its land area. Only 7 percent is barren or urban land. However, the land use is considerably different in the upper  of the watershed. This part of the watershed is 57 percent forested, 38 percent mine spoils (including some that have been hidden by forest growth), 5 percent urban land, and less than 1 percent agricultural land. In the early 1900s, there were marshes on the creek below Shamokin.

Most of the land along the upper reaches of Shamokin Creek is commercial and industrial, with trash lining the streambanks. Further downstream, the creek flows through a broad floodplain, but remains impacted by development and has culm lining its cobble bars. Downstream of Snydertown, the landscape through which the creek flows is no longer impacted by development or mining and consists of forests and agricultural land.

Pennsylvania Route 61 follows the main stem of Shamokin Creek for much of the creek's length.

History and etymology
Shamokin Creek was entered into the Geographic Names Information System on August 2, 1979. Its identifier in the Geographic Names Information System is 1193324. The creek is also known as Great Shamokin Creek and Middle Branch Shamokin Creek. The former name appears in Thomas Francis Gordon's A Gazetteer of the State of Pennsylvania, which was published in 1833. The latter name appears in a 1982 county highway map made by the Pennsylvania Department of Transportation. The creek is named after a Delaware word for "Eel Creek".

Many of the early settlers in the valley of Shamokin Creek were Scotch-Irish. The first mill in the current boundaries of Northumberland County was built on or near the creek in 1774. A road up the creek's valley was being laid out by 1775. The first coal in Shamokin was discovered in Shamokin Creek at what is now Spurzheim Street and Clay Street. Before the War of 1812, Abraham Cherry constructed a sawmill on Shamokin Creek. Some coal mining was being done at the creek by 1825. A dam was constructed on the creek in Shamokin in 1826 and John C. Byrd opened a stone coal quarry on the creek in the same year. The only canal boat on Shamokin Creek was launched in the early 1830s.

In the early 1900s, the most significant industries in the watershed of Shamokin Creek were coal mining, foundries, iron works, nail production, agriculture, silk mills, and woolen mills. The creek was also used as water power for several small mills and was used as a water supply for the Pennsylvania Railroad. The Roaring Creek Water Company also used some of its tributaries as water supplies.

Major settlements in the watershed of Shamokin Creek in the early 1900s included Shamokin, Mount Carmel, and Sunbury. Their populations were 19,588, 17,532, and 13,770, respectively. The main railroads in the watershed at this time were the Pennsylvania Railroad, the Philadelphia and Reading Railroad (both of which followed the creek for much of its length), and the Lehigh Valley Railroad (which crossed the upper part of the watershed).

Shamokin Creek was impacted by waste from coal mines as early as the early 1900s. Anthracite mining was historically a prevalent industry in the watershed. Although production peaked in 1917, with 4400 men mining 6.2 million tons of coal annually, coal mining still continues in the watershed. Most mines in the watershed closed by 1960 and mining in the watershed is not expected to increase in the future. However, as of 2001, there are more than 20 mining permits in the watershed.

A bridge known as the Shamokin Creek Bridge carries Pennsylvania Route 61 over Shamokin Creek in Sunbury. It is a through truss bridge that was built in 1933 and repaired in 1981. It has little historical significance.

Shamokin Creek was the subject of an Operation Scarlift report in 1972. The Shamokin Creek Restoration Alliance was founded in 1996 with the purpose of "[encouraging] partnerships and develop[ing] incentives and methods to facilitate funding for reclamation of abandoned mine lands (AML) in Shamokin Creek watershed."

In 1999, the Northumberland County Conservation District received a $52,830 to assess Shamokin Creek. In the same year, the Shamokin Creek Restoration Alliance received a $5000 grant from the Eastern Pennsylvania Coalition for Abandoned Mine Restoration. Various grants for passive treatment systems in the watershed were also given in 1999. In 2002, the Northumberland County Planning Commission received a $75,000 Growing Greener grant to eliminate sources of impairment in the watershed of Shamokin Creek. In 2003, the Northumberland County Conservation District and the Shamokin Creek Restoration Alliance received more than $500,000 in grants from the United States Environmental Protection Agency to repair abandoned mine drainage sources in the watershed.

A flood control project was carried out on Shamokin Creek in Mount Carmel in 2013.

Biology
The main stem of Shamokin Creek is designated as a Warmwater Fishery and a Migratory Fishery. However, all of the creek's tributariesincluding unnamed ones are designated as Coldwater Fisheries and Migratory Fisheries.

The main stem of Shamokin Creek is not inhabited by any aquatic life upstream of the tributary Carbon Run. However, the creek supports six species of fish further downstream.

In 2001, there were 169 individual fish from eight species in Shamokin Creek at Shamokin. The most common species were white suckers (74 individuals), creek chubs (48 individuals), and spotfin shiners (31 individuals). Other species included pumpkinseeds, (7 individuals), green sunfish (5 individuals), yellow bullhead (2 individuals), stonerollers, and rainbow trout (1 individual each).

In Shamokin Creek at Sunbury, there were 112 individual fish from 14 different species. The most common species were smallmouth bass (46 individuals), fallfish (24 individuals), and white suckers (14 individuals). Less common species included pumpkinseeds (six individuals), chain pickerel (five individuals), and spotfin shiners (five individuals). Rarer species included Margined madtom (three individuals) and rock bass and brown bullhead (two individuals each). Only one creek chub, green sunfish, bluegill, tessellated darter, and walleye were observed.

Historically, Shamokin Creek had large populations of pike, sunfish, suckers, and eels.

Many areas in the upper reaches of Shamokin Creek support little or no macroinvertebrate life due to metals coating the streambed. In August 1999, more than 500 coliform colonies per 100 milliliters were observed in the creek near Shamokin, of which 97 were E. coli.

Recreation
The scenery is described as "Poor to Fair" in Edward Gertler's book Keystone Canoeing. Gertler's book stated that "If there is ever a 'March of Dimes' campaign for crippled and deformed creeks, then Shamokin [Creek] will be chosen as the poster stream." The difficulty rating of the creek ranges from 1 to 3.

Pennsylvania State Game Lands Number 165 is on Little Mountain and is partially in the Shamokin Creek watershed. The other part of the game lands is in the drainage basin of Mahanoy Creek.

Gallery

See also
West Branch Susquehanna River, next tributary of the Susquehanna River going upriver
Rolling Green Run, next tributary of the Susquehanna River going downriver
List of rivers of Pennsylvania

Notes

References

External links

Operation Scarlift report for Shamokin Creek
Shamokin Creek Restoration Alliance

Rivers of Pennsylvania
Tributaries of the Susquehanna River
Rivers of Northumberland County, Pennsylvania